NRP Bérrio (A5210) was a fleet support tanker of the Portuguese Navy. She was built by Swan Hunter in 1969 at Hebburn, England as RFA Blue Rover (A270) of the Rover-class and from 1970 to 1993 was part of the British Royal Fleet Auxiliary. In 1982 during her British service she participated in the Falklands War.

In 1993, she was sold to the Portuguese Navy who renamed her Bérrio. She participated in Operation Crocodile (Operação Crocodilo) in 1998, as part of the Portuguese naval task force that rescued foreign nationals caught up in the civil conflicts in Guinea-Bissau and then supported the mediators of the CPLP in the peace talks between the parties in the conflict.

The vessel was decommissioned on 1 June 2020.

References

Ships of the Royal Fleet Auxiliary
Tankers of the Royal Fleet Auxiliary
Rover-class tankers
Falklands War naval ships of the United Kingdom
1969 ships
Auxiliary ships of the Portuguese Navy